La Martre is a commune in the Var department in the Provence-Alpes-Côte d'Azur region in southeastern France.

See also
Communes of the Var department

References

Communes of Var (department)